Lion man or similar may refer to:

Lion-man, a prehistoric sculpture discovered in a German cave in 1939
Craig Busch (born 1964), New Zealand big-cat expert
The Lion Man, a New Zealand television documentary series featuring Busch
The Lion Man (1936 film), an American film
The Lion Man (serial), a 1919 American action film serial
Narasimha, an avatar of the Hindu god Vishnu
Kaiketsu Lion-Maru, a 1972 Japanese tokusatsu production known as Lion-Man outside Japan
Fuun Lion-Maru, a 1973 Japanese tokusatsu production known as Lion-Man outside Japan
Cory Marks, country rock musician sometimes known by the nickname "Lion Man"